Kwai Luen is one of the 31 constituencies in the Kwai Tsing District.

Created in 2018 for the 2019 District Council elections, the constituency returns one district councillor to the Kwai Tsing District Council, with an election every four years.

Kwai Luen loosely covers area surrounding Kwai Luen Estate in Kwai Chung. It has projected population of 13,492.

Councillors represented

Ng was the member of Kwai Tsing District Council representing Hing Fong Constituency, which is in proximity to this constituency, from 1999 to 2019.

Election results

2010s

References

Kwai Chung
Constituencies of Hong Kong
Constituencies of Kwai Tsing District Council
2019 establishments in Hong Kong
Constituencies established in 2019